Stono may refer to:

Virginia 
 Stono, also known as Jordan's Point, a historic home located at Lexington, Virginia, in the United States of America (USA).

South Carolina 
 Stono River, located southwest of Charleston, South Carolina (USA);
 Stono (South Carolina), an 18th-century plantation, formerly located by the Stono River near Charleston, South Carolina (USA);
 Stono Bridge, which crosses the Stono River in Charleston, South Carolina (USA);
 Stono Rebellion, a slave rebellion that broke out in 1739 in the British colony of South Carolina, (modern USA);
 Battle of Stono Ferry, an American Revolutionary War battle, fought on June 20, 1779 near Charleston, South Carolina (USA).

Missouri 
 Stono Mountain, a summit in St. Francois County in the state of Missouri (USA).

Other uses 
 CSS Stono, last name given to the USS Isaac Smith, a screw steamer captured in 1863 by Confederate forces during the American Civil War.